Dobir Saheber Songsar  is a Bangladeshi Bengali-language romantic comedy film directed by Zakir Hossain Raju. Bappy Chowdhury, Mahiya Mahi and Asif Imrose lead role. The film co-star Ali Raj, Alexander Bo and many more. Releasing on 4 April 2014. Shakib Khan played a cameo role in this film.

Plot
This film is about Mr. Dobir, (Ali Raj) who has lost his second Daughter (Mahiya Mahi) in her childhood. Meanwhile, He appointed two servants Kuddus (Bappy Chowdhury) and Akkas (Asif Imrose).

Cast
 Mahiya Mahi as Mr. Dobir's Daughter
 Bappy Chowdhury as Kuddus 
 Asif Imrose as Akkas
 Ali Raj as Gulzar
 Rebeka Rouf
 Alexander Bo
 Shakib Khan as Cameo Appearance

See also
 Amar Praner Priya

References

Bengali-language Bangladeshi films
Films scored by Ahmed Imtiaz Bulbul
Films scored by Shafiq Tuhin
Films directed by Zakir Hossain Raju
2010s Bengali-language films
Jaaz Multimedia films